Dušan Janićijević (born February 2, 1955 in Belgrade) is a Serbian former long-distance runner who represented Yugoslavia at the 1976 Summer Olympics in 10,000 metres.

External links
 
 

1955 births
Living people
Serbian male long-distance runners
Yugoslav male long-distance runners
Olympic athletes of Yugoslavia
Athletes (track and field) at the 1976 Summer Olympics
Athletes from Belgrade
20th-century Serbian people